Yvon Charbonneau,  (July 11, 1940 – April 22, 2016) was a Canadian politician.

Charbonneau was born in Mont-Saint-Michel, Quebec and was a member of the Liberal Party of Canada in the House of Commons of Canada, representing the constituency of Anjou—Rivière-des-Prairies from 1997 to 2004. He is a former administrator, consultant, professor, and unionist. In Parliament, he was Parliamentary Secretary to the Deputy Prime Minister and Minister of Public Safety and Emergency Preparedness with special emphasis on Emergency Preparedness, and Parliamentary Secretary to the Minister of Health.

He did not run in the 2004 election.

Charbonneau was also a member of the National Assembly of Quebec as a Liberal in the riding of Bourassa from 1994 to 1997.

Electoral record (partial)

External links
 
 
Foreign Affairs and International Trade Canada Complete List of Posts
Yvon Charbonneau was the conscience of Quebec’s union movement Globe and Mail obituary by Lisa Fitterman, 25 May 2016

1940 births
2016 deaths
Trade unionists from Quebec
Liberal Party of Canada MPs
Members of the House of Commons of Canada from Quebec
Members of the King's Privy Council for Canada
Quebec Liberal Party MNAs
21st-century Canadian politicians